Paulo Andrés Ferrari (born 4 January 1982) is an Argentine football manager and former player who played as a right-back. He is the current manager of San Martín de San Juan.

Career 
Ferrari grew as a product of Rosario Central, where he had his youth career. He later became a symbol and captain of Central before joining River Plate at the start of the 2006 Apertura tournament. In 2011, following his release from River Plate, Ferrari returned to Rosario Central.

Honours 
River Plate
Argentine Primera División: 2008 Clausura
Rosario Central
Primera B Nacional: 2012–13

External links 
 Argentine Primera statistics at Fútbol XXI 

1982 births
Living people
Footballers from Rosario, Santa Fe
Association football fullbacks
Argentine footballers
Argentine Primera División players
Primera Nacional players
Rosario Central footballers
Club Atlético River Plate footballers
Argentine people of Italian descent
Argentine football managers
San Martín de San Juan managers
Rosario Central managers